Tonpa Shenrab  ( "Teacher Shenrab") or Shenrab Miwo—also called the Buddha Shenrab, Guru Shenrab and a number of other titles—is the legendary founder of the Bon tradition of Tibet.

The story of Tonpa Shenrab was revealed in a fourteenth century terma of Loden Nyingpo.

Etymology
The name Shenrab Miwo is in the Zhang-Zhung language, which is a relative of Old Tibetan; while many suggestions have been put forward as to its meaning, it appears to be the Zhangzhung word "bodhisattva" (equivalent to Tibetan shégya sempa).

Shenrab's life according to Bon traditions 
According to Bon doctrine, Tonpa Shenrab lived 18,000 years ago, predating Gautama Buddha. Practitioners of Bon believe that he first studied the Bon doctrine in Tagzig Olmo Lung Ring, at the end of which he pledged to Shenlha Okar, the god of compassion, that he would guide the peoples of this world to liberation.

Like Gautama, Tönpa Shenrab was of royal birth. Tonpa Shenrab renounced his royal inheritance at the age of thirty-one to travel the path to enlightenment. Tonpa Shenrab embraced the life of a renunciate and commenced austerities, spreading the doctrine of Bon; at length, he arrived in the land of Zhangzhung near what is widely held to be Mount Kailash.

Accounts of Tonpa Shenrab's life are to be found in three principal sources, the Dodü, Zermik, and Ziji. The first and second of the accounts are held to be terma discovered by tertön in the 10th or 11th century; the third is part of the oral lineage transmitted from teacher to disciple.

Aspects of Shenrab Miwoche
Shenrab Miwoche is said to have three aspects or forms:
 the tulku or nirmaṇakāya, Shenrab Miwoche;
 the dzokku or sambhogakāya, Shenlha Okar and
 the bönku or dharmakāya, Tapihritsa.

Footnotes

References
 Bellezza, John Vincent. (2010). "gShen-rab Myi-bo, His life and times according to Tibet’s earliest literary sources." Revue d’Etudes Tibétaines Number 19 October 2010, pp. 31–118.
Unknown Author (2005). The Bonpo's Tradition.  (Accessed: January 17, 2007).

External links
61 episodes in the life of gŚen-rabs mi-bo

Bon
Year of birth missing
Year of death missing
Founders of religions
Bon deities